Surface stress was first defined by Josiah Willard Gibbs (1839-1903) as the amount of the reversible work per unit area needed to elastically stretch a pre-existing surface. A  suggestion is  surface stress define as association with the amount of the reversible work per unit area needed to elastically stretch a pre-existing surface instead of up definition. A similar term called "surface free energy", which represents the excess free energy per unit area needed to create a new surface, is easily confused with "surface stress". Although surface stress and surface free energy of liquid–gas or liquid–liquid interface are the same, they are very different in solid–gas or solid–solid interface, which will be discussed in details later. Since both terms represent a force per unit length, they have been referred to as "surface tension", which contributes further to the confusion in the literature.

Thermodynamics of surface stress

Definition of surface free energy is seemly the amount of reversible work  performed to create new area  of surface, expressed as:

Gibbs was the first to define another surface quantity, different from the surface tension , that is associated with the reversible work per unit area needed to elastically stretch a pre-existing surface. Surface stress can be derived from surface free energy as follows:

Now consider the two reversible paths showed in figure 0. The first path (clockwise), the solid object is cut into two same pieces. Then both pieces are elastically strained. For the second step, work, equals the work needed to elastically deform the total bulk volume and the four (two original and two newly formed) surfaces.

In the second path (counter-clockwise), the subject is first elastically strained and then is cut in two pieces. The work for the first step here,  is equal to that needed to deform the bulk volume and the two surfaces. The difference  is equal to the excess work needed to elastically deform two surfaces of area  to area  or:

These two paths are completely reversible, or W2 – W1 = W2 – W1. It means:

Since d(γA) = γdA + Adγ, and dA = Aδijdeij. Then surface stress can be expressed as:

Where δij is the Kronecker delta and eij is elastic strain tensor.
Differently from the surface free energy γ, which is a scalar, surface stress fij is a second rank tensor. However, for a general surface, set of principal axes that are off-diagonal components are identically zero. Surface that possesses a threefold or higher rotation axis symmetry, diagonal components are equal. Therefore, surface stress can be rewritten as a scalar:

Now it can be easily explained why f and γ are equal in liquid-gas or liquid-liquid interfaces. Due to the chemical structure of liquid surface phase, the term ∂γ/∂e always equals to zero meaning that surface free energy won’t change even if the surface is being stretched. However, ∂γ/∂e is not zero in solid surface due do the fact that surface atomic structure of solid are modified in elastic deformation.

Physical origins of surface stress

Origin of surface stress could be understood by nature of chemical bonding of atoms at the surface. In metallic materials, atomic chemical bonding structure at the surface is very different from in the bulk. Therefore, equilibrium interatomic distance between surface atoms is different from bulk atoms. Since surface and bulk atoms are structurally coherent, the interior of the solid can be considered as applying a stress on the surface.

For illustration, figure 1 shows a simple picture of bond charges near the surface of a 2D crystal with charge (election) density around sphere atoms. Surface atoms only have two nearest neighbors compared with bulk atoms, which have four (for this example case). The loss of neighbors which results from the creation of a metal surface reduces the local electron density around the atoms near the surface. Surface atoms then sit in a lower average electron density than bulk atoms. The response of these surface atoms would be to attempt to reduce their interatomic distance in order to increase surrounding charge density. Therefore, surface atoms would create a positive surface stress (tensile). In the other words, if the surface charge density is the same as in the bulk, surface stress would be zero.

Surface stress, which created by redistribution of electron density around surface atoms, can be both positive (tensile) or negative (compressive). If the surface is not clean meaning there are atoms sitting on a flat surface (adsorbates), charge density would then be modified leading to a different surface stress state compared with a perfect clean surface.

Measurement of surface stress

Theoretical calculations

Surface stresses normally calculated by calculating the surface free energy and its derivative with respect to elastic strain. Different methods have been used such as first principles, atomistic potential calculations and molecular dynamics simulations. Most of calculations are done at temperature of 0 K. Following are tables of surface stress and surface free energy values of metals and semiconductors. Details of these calculations could be found in the attached references.

FCC Metal surfaces (111)

More metal surfaces

Semiconductor surfaces

III-V compounds

Experimental measurements

In the early time,  several experimental techniques to measure surface stress of materials had been proposed. One was determining surface stress by measuring curvature of a thin membrane of the material as it bends by gravitation through its own weight. This method turned out to be difficult since it requires a complete homogeneous single crystal surface. An alternative way to measure absolute surface stress is to measure the elastic extension of the length of the thin wire under an applied force. However, this method had many limitations and wasn’t used popularly. While determination of the absolute surface stress is still a challenge, the experimental technique to measure changes in the surface stress due to external interaction is well established using “cantilever bending method”. The principle of the measurement is shown in figure 2. In this case, stress of one surface is changed upon deposition of material which results the bending of the cantilever. The surface wants to expand creating a compressive stress. Figure 2b shows the two electrodes of the capacitor formed by the sample and a capacitor electrode c. The capacitor electrode is surrounded by a guard electrode in order to minimize the effects of stray capacitances. The sample b is clamped on one end in the sample holder a. The bending can also be measured with high sensitivity by deflection of the beam of a laser using a position sensitive detector. To use this method, it requires that the sample is thin enough. Some experiment measurement values are listed in table 5.

Surface stress effects in materials science

Surface structural reconstruction

Structural reconstruction at the surfaces has been studied extensively by both theoretical and experimental methods. However, a question about surface stress is high enough to be a main driving force of the reconstruction is still not very clear.

Most of metallic surface reconstruction exhibit in two genetic forms. On the original (100) surface, it would form a hexagonal overlayer which results in a considerably higher density of surface atoms by 20–25%.  On the original (111) surface, since it already in closed-pack structure, the higher density is due to a contraction while the local coordination of the surface atoms remains a hexagonal one. Another way to explain the surface reconstruction phenomenon is called “soft phonon type of reconstruction”. The driving force for a change in the surface concentration associated with a contraction of the surface is proportional to the difference between surface stress and surface free energy. It corresponds to the amount of energy gained by structure transformation to over the surface stress. For semiconductor surface, forming dimer is the way for it to response to the tensile stress. Figure 3 shows an example of Si(100) surface reconstruction that create tensile stress.

Adsorbate-induced changes in the surface stress

As mentioned above, surface stress is caused by charge density redistribution of surface atoms due to lacking of nearest neighbor atoms. In case of introduction of adsorbates (atoms that land on surface), charge density would be then modified around these adsorbates, resulting different surface stress state. There are many types of reaction between adsorbates and the surface that cause different stress behavior. Here, two most common behaviors are shown:

Coverage dependence of the adsorbate-induced surface stress

Coverage effect of surface stress without surface reconstruction usually result a compressive stress (assuming clean surface as reference or zero stress). Induced surface stress of number of different coverages on Ni(100) and Pt(111) surface is shown in figure 4. In all cases, it shows an initially linear increase of the induced stress with coverage, followed by an increase larger than linear at higher coverages. The non-linear increase is first thought to be due to the repulsive interaction between adsorbates. The repulsive interaction should be proportional to the overlap integrals summed of non-bonding orbitals with exponential relationship:

    Sij & exp(-crij)

where rij is distance between two adsorbate i and j

One can easily relate the mean distance between two adsorbates with square root of the coverage:

     Sij & exp(-c/√θ)

Then the stress induced by absorbates can be derived as:

     ∆τ=a.θ+b.exp(-c/√θ)     (8)

where a, b, and c are fitting parameters. Figure 4 shows very good fits for all systems with the equation 8.

However, later research shows that direct repulsive interaction between absorbate atoms (as well as dipolar interactions) contribute very little to the induced surface stress. The stress can become large only if the distance between the adsorbed atoms becomes small so that φij (repulsive pairwise interaction potential) becomes large. It rarely happens without very high gas pressure since adsorbated state become unstable with respect to desorption.

Adsorbate-induced stress and restructuring of surfaces

It shows that the tensile stress on clean surfaces can be so strong that the surface reconstructs to form an overlayer of higher charge density. In the presence of adsorbates, stress induced by could also be high enough for such reconstruction. The mechanism of the reconstruction of the two processes would be similar. The reconstruction due to adsorbates is easily recognized by deviation from stress-induced vs. coverage relationship. One example is shown in figure 5 and 6. It shows clearly the difference between stress-induced behavior of silicon compared with oxygen or carbon absorbate on Ni(100) surface. S/Ni(100) system reaches very high stress at the coverage of ~0.3. This stress then causes a reconstruction (figure 5) to increase the charge density of surface atoms in order to reduce the developed stress.

The surface stress due to the adsorption of alkanethiol/alkylthiols on thin gold films have been studied using experimental and computational approaches. Zhao et al., showed that majority of the surface stress originated due to the reconstruction of the surface, resulting from the electron loss from the neighboring gold atoms of the surface adsorbed sulphur adatom.

See also
 Gibbs free energy
 Surface tension
 First principles calculation
 Molecular dynamics simulations
 Nanocrystalline materials
 Nanowire materials
 Nanoporous materials

References

Physical quantities
Materials science
Surface science